The Children's Apparel Network is an American company whose products include department and specialty store layette, newborn and infant apparel. In 2005, they licensed the Sesame Beginnings brand for some products.  Children's Apparel Network is located in Manhattan  at 31 West 34th Street, Floor 11 New York, NY 10001.  As of 2007 the Children's Apparel Network began using JBCStyle  as its primary fashion talent recruitment agency.  JBCStyle with offices in New York and Los Angeles is the leading recruiter in the fashion, beauty, home as well as the action sports industries.

References

Children's clothing retailers
Clothing companies of the United States
Companies based in New York City